Chamara Sampath Dasanayaka (born 31 August 1971) is a Sri Lankan politician and the former Chief Minister of Uva Province in Sri Lanka.

Dassanayake was first elected to Uva Provincial Council at the 1994 provincial council elections, he served in a number of positions, including as the Provincial Minister of Sports and Youth Affairs. At the 2015 Sri Lankan parliamentary election Dasanayaka was elected to the Parliament of Sri Lanka representing the Badulla electorate, as a member of the United People's Freedom Alliance. He however resigned from parliament to take up the role of Uva Chief Minister, after the position was vacated by the incumbent, Harin Fernando, who was also elected to parliament at the 2015 parliamentary elections representing Badulla.

In January 2018 Dissanyake stood down from his position as Provincial Education Minister whilst an investigation by the Human Rights Commission of Sri Lanka was being undertaken. The investigation related to an incident were Dissanyake allegedly demeaned a local school principal. In April he was controversially re-instated back as the Education Minister by the Governor of Uva Province Marappullige Jayasinghe.

At the 16th parliamentary elections, held on 5 August 2020, Dassanayake ran again for a seat from the Badulla electorate, representing the Sri Lanka Podujana Peramuna (SLPP). He polled 66,393 votes and was one of six SLPP members to be elected.

References

Living people
1971 births
Members of the 15th Parliament of Sri Lanka
 Members of the 16th Parliament of Sri Lanka
Chief Ministers of Uva Province